This is a list of the notable faculty of the University of Missouri: professors, lecturers and researchers.

Arts, film, music and literature
Omowale Akintunde filmmaker
William Berry emeritus professor, former chair of art department
George Caleb Bingham American artist
Michael J. Budds, musicologist
Melissa Click mass communications educator
Julia Gaines, percussionist
Albert Lewin film director and producer
Lily Mabura, Kenyan writer

Athletics
Chester Brewer, MU football coach

Education
James Thomas Quarles, organist and educator

History
Lewis Eldon Atherton, historian, Guggenheim fellow 
Susan Porter Benson (1943–2005), labor historian 
Kerby A. Miller, historian of Ireland and Irish immigration, currently teaching at the University of Missouri.

Journalism
Judy Bolch, Houston Harte Chair in Journalism
Roy M. Fisher, Dean of School of Journalism (1971–1982)

Government and Law
Duane Benton federal judge
Philemon Bliss Ohio congressman
Dennis Crouch, author of the widely read "Patently-O" blog on United States patent law
Chuck Gross, former Missouri senator
Ed Robb, former Director of the College of Business and Public Administration Research Center, the Economic Policy and Analysis Research Center, and the State and Fiscal Studies Unit.

Science and technology
James William Abert explorer
Edgar Allen discovered estrogen
Leonard Blumenthal mathematician
Rick Brandenburg etymologist
Max Mapes Ellis, physiologist and explorer
David C. Geary, developmental psychologist
Linda M. Godwin, former astronaut, astronomy and physics professor
Mary Jane Guthrie, zoologist and cancer researcher
Eliot S. Hearst, psychologist and professional chess player
Steve Hofmann, mathematician
Bahram Mashhoon, General Relativity physicist
Maurice Mehl, paleontologist and geologist
George Rédei plant biologist
George P. Smith, winner of the 2018 Nobel Prize in chemistry
Zbylut Twardowski nephrologist

Social sciences
Joseph Haslag Kenneth Lay Chair in Economics
Thorstein Veblen economist
Winifred Smeaton Thomas, anthropologist

References

 
University of Missouri faculty
faculty